Wilson Dobie Wilson FRSE FSA (Scot) (30 November 1803 – 1838) was a nineteenth-century Scottish author, editor and traveller.  He was a member of the Maitland Club council, and a member of the Honourable Faculty of Advocates though he did not practise.
He lived in Gleverebach.

Wilson married Georgiana Summer, daughter of John Sumner, Bishop of Chester. They had one son and one daughter.

Bibliography
 Description of an Ancient Cross: at Kilmory in Argyleshire (1839)

References

Scottish antiquarians
Fellows of the Royal Society of Edinburgh
1803 births
1838 deaths
Fellows of the Society of Antiquaries of Scotland